The Independent Label Market is an open market founded by Joe Daniel and Katie Riding that provides a venue for the proprietors of over 160 independent record labels to sell their products to the public. The market also provides an opportunity for listeners to meet the founders of record labels and some of the artists.

History
The Independent Label Market was first set up in May 2011 on Berwick Street, London, United Kingdom, and has since returned twice a year to Old Spitalfields Market. The market is held in conjunction with the London Brewers Market.

The market also launched in Brooklyn, New york in October 2011, Silverlake, Los Angeles in November 2012, Toronto in June 2013,. and Glasgow in October 2013.

Some of the labels that take part in the market include Rough Trade, Mute, XL, Domino, Fabric, 4AD, DFA Records, Angular Records, R&S, Infectious, Bella Union and Fool's Gold. Notable appearances at the market's stalls include Diplo, Gilles Peterson, Coldcut, Daniel Miller, Simon Raymonde, Erol Alkan, Tim Burgess and Edwyn Collins.

Many recordings on vinyl are to be found at the market stalls. As well, some artists have made special releases available exclusively at the various markets. Some examples of these have been: 200 signed copies of Portishead’s ‘Chase the Tear’ 12” where all profits from the sales went to Amnesty International, Young Turks auction of the only copy of a Jamie xx remix of Radiohead’s ‘Bloom’, Richard Russell’s 20 hand-made rave/grime/garage/jungle/dubstep mixtapes for the XL stall, and the only signed copy of Elton John’s “Are You Ready For Love” on pink, half speed cut 220gsm vinyl.

Labels 

The labels that have taken part in the markets are:

References

External links 
 facebook.com/independentlabelmarket 
 twitter.com/IndieLabelMkt
 “How to set up an Indie Label Market” The Guardian, [retrieved 22/04/2013]

2011 establishments in the United Kingdom
Independent record labels